John Maxwell "Jackie" Huggard (28 January 1926 – 20 April 2016) was an Australian rules footballer who played with Essendon and North Melbourne in the Victorian Football League (VFL). He won Essendon's reserves best and fairest in 1945. He worked as an engineer for Trans Australia Airlines. Huggard's father, Jack, played VFL football for Richmond.

Notes

External links 

Essendon Football Club past player profile

1926 births
2016 deaths
Australian rules footballers from Victoria (Australia)
Essendon Football Club players
North Melbourne Football Club players
Cobram Football Club players